Hesperotettix pacificus is a species of spur-throated grasshopper in the family Acrididae. It is found in North America.

Subspecies
These two subspecies belong to the species Hesperotettix pacificus:
 Hesperotettix pacificus capillatus Hebard, 1919 i c g
 Hesperotettix pacificus pacificus Scudder, 1897 i c g
Data sources: i = ITIS, c = Catalogue of Life, g = GBIF, b = Bugguide.net

References

Melanoplinae
Articles created by Qbugbot
Insects described in 1897